This is a list of the orchids, sorted in alphabetical order, found in Metropolitan France.

A 
 Anacamptis laxiflora
 Anacamptis longicornu
 Anacamptis morio
 Anacamptis palustris

C 
 Cephalanthera longifolia

D 
 Dactylorhiza incarnata

E 
 Epipactis phyllanthes

G 
 Goodyera repens

O 
 Ophrys aurelia
 Ophrys catalaunica
 Ophrys saratoi
 Ophrys drumana
 Orchis mascula

S 
 Serapias lingua

References 

France